Majengo is an administrative ward in the Mbeya Urban district of the Mbeya Region of Tanzania. In 2016 the Tanzania National Bureau of Statistics report there were 3,652 people in the ward, from 3,314 in 2012.

Neighborhoods 
The ward has 2 neighborhoods; Majengo Kaskazini, and Majengo Kusini.

References 

Wards of Mbeya Region